Harold Connor (23 December 1929 – November 2016) was an English footballer who played for Stoke. He was the last amateur to play for the club.

Career
Born in Liverpool, Connor began playing football with Peterborough United as he was serving with RAF Halton. He returned to his native Merseyside and became a PE teacher in Crosby and played football with non-league Marine. He joined professional side Stoke City in 1952 signing on amateur contract forms and scored within 10 minutes on his debut against Sunderland in March 1953. After he declined to sign a professional contract he was released by manager Frank Taylor and Connor returned to Marine whilst continuing to work as a teacher.

Career statistics

References

1929 births
2016 deaths
Footballers from Liverpool
Association football forwards
English footballers
Peterborough United F.C. players
Marine F.C. players
Stoke City F.C. players
English Football League players